William Dorris Davis (November 10, 1916 – November 8, 1994) was an American football tackle. A native of Grapevine, Texas, he played college football for Texas Tech. He was drafted by the Chicago Cardinals with the 91st pick in the 1940 NFL Draft and appeared in 40 NFL games for the Cardinals (1940-1941), Brooklyn Dodgers (1943), and Miami Seahawks (1946).

References

1916 births
1994 deaths
Chicago Cardinals players
Texas Tech Red Raiders football players
Players of American football from Texas
People from Grapevine, Texas